The City of Derry Tramways was a tramway in Derry, Ireland that operated from 1897 until 1919. This was a standard gauge line served by horse trams and was never electrified.

The tramway had only one line. The tramway's southern terminus was by Craigavon Bridge and its northern terminus was between Graving Dock and Pennyburn. Intermediate stops included:
Water St. (loop)
Shipquay Place, Guildhall (loop)
Foyle College (loop)
Depot
It served the GNR's  station, the LPHC's  station and the Londonderry and Lough Swilly Railway's  station.

City of Derry Tramways ceased operations in 1919.

References

Sources

Tram transport in Ireland before partition
Transport in County Londonderry
History of Derry (city)